Alejandro Alonso Núñez (born 20 August 1951 in Valdepeñas, Spain) is a Spanish politician.

Married with two daughters, Alonso Núñez is a qualified veterinarian. He was a government official of the Cuerpo Nacional de Veterinarios (National Body of Veterinarians), and served as an advisor of Industry in Castilla-La Mancha from 1993 — 1996, as well as an advisor for Agriculture and Environment in Castilla-La Mancha from 1996 — 2003. Earlier he served as advisor to the Presidency of Castilla-La Mancha from 1987 — 1993.

He has been a presidential spokesman for the Socialist Municipal Group of Toledo and President of the Provincial Executive for the Spanish Socialist Workers' Party in Toledo (2004). In 2004 he was elected to the Spanish Congress of Deputies representing Toledo district and was re-elected in 2008.

References
Biography in El Pais, 9 March 2008

1951 births
Living people
People from the Province of Ciudad Real
Members of the 8th Congress of Deputies (Spain)
Members of the 9th Congress of Deputies (Spain)
Spanish Socialist Workers' Party politicians
Spanish veterinarians